Wilhelm Friedrich Karwinsky von Karwin (19 February 1780 – 2 March 1855) was a Bavarian naturalist who collected plants and animals in Brazil (1821–1826) and Mexico (1826–1831, 1840). He was born in Keszthely, now in Hungary, and died in Munich. Many plants and animals are named in his honour, including the genus Karwinskia and the species Erigeron karvinskianus (Mexican daisy) and Smyrna karwinskii (the butterfly Karwinski's beauty).

References

1780 births
German naturalists
1855 deaths